This article lists the characters and related details for the CBBC children's television series Young Dracula.

Main cast

Extended family

The Branaghs

The Van Helsings

Ramanga Clan

At Garside Grange

References

Young dracula